, also called , , and , are Japanese emblems used to decorate and identify an individual, a family, or (more recently) an institution or business entity. While  is an encompassing term that may refer to any such device,  and  refer specifically to emblems that are used to identify a family. An authoritative  reference compiles Japan's 241 general categories of  based on structural resemblance (a single  may belong to multiple categories), with 5,116 distinct individual . However, it is well acknowledged that there are a number of lost or obscure .

History

 may have originated as fabric patterns to be used on clothes in order to distinguish individuals or signify membership of a specific clan or organization. By the 12th century, sources give a clear indication that heraldry had been implemented as a distinguishing feature, especially for use in battle. It is seen on flags, tents, and equipment.

Like European heraldry,  were initially held only by aristocratic families, and were gradually adapted by commoners. On the battlefield,  served as army standards, even though this usage was not universal and uniquely designed army standards were just as common as -based standards (cf.).  were also adapted by various organizations, such as merchant and artisan guilds, temples and shrines, theater troupes and even criminal gangs. In an illiterate society, they served as useful symbols for recognition.

Commoners without  often used those of their patron or the organization they belonged to. In cases when none of those were available, they sometimes used one of the few  which were seen as "vulgar", or invented or adapted whatever  they wished, passing it on to their descendants. It was not uncommon for shops, and therefore shop-owners, to develop  to identify themselves.

It was considered improper to use a  that was known to be held by someone else, and offensive to use a  that was held by someone of a high rank. When  came into conflict, the lower-ranked person sometimes changed their  to avoid offending their superior. The  held by the ruling clans of Japan, such as Tokugawa's hollyhock  and the Emperor's chrysanthemum , were legally protected from unauthorized usage.

Occasionally, patron clans granted the use of their  to their retainers as a reward. Similar to the granting of the patron's surnames, this was considered a very high honor. Alternatively, the patron clan may have added elements of its  to that of its retainer, or chosen an entirely different  for them.

Design

Most consist of a roundel encircling a figure of plant, animal, man-made, natural or celestial objects, all abstracted to various degrees. Religious symbols, geometric shapes and kanji were commonly used as well.

Similar to the blazon in European heraldry,  are also named by the content of the design, even though there is no set rule for such names.

For example, the paulownia crest with 5-7-5 leaves is reserved for the prime minister, whereas paulownia with fewer leaves could be used by anyone. The imperial chrysanthemum also specifies 16 petals, whereas chrysanthemum with fewer petals are used by other lesser imperial family members.

Japanese heraldry does not have a cadency or quartering system, but it is not uncommon for cadet branches of a family to choose a slightly different  from the senior branch. Each princely family, for example, uses a modified chrysanthemum crest as their .  holders may also combine their  with that of their patron, benefactor or spouse, sometimes creating increasingly complicated designs.

 are essentially monochrome; the color does not constitute part of the design and they may be drawn in any color.

Modern usage

Many websites also offer  lookup services. Professional wedding planners, undertakers and other "ritual masters" may also offer guidance on finding the proper .

 are seen widely on stores and shops engaged in traditional crafts and specialties. The paulownia  appears on the obverse side of the 500 yen coin.

A woman may still wear her maiden  if she wishes and pass it on to her daughters; she does not have to adopt her husband's or father's . Flowers, trees, plants and birds are also common elements of  designs.

 also add formality to a kimono. A kimono may have one, three or five . The  themselves can be either formal or informal, depending on the formality of the kimono, with formality ranging from the most formal 'full sun' crests to the least formal 'shadow' crests. Very formal kimono display more , frequently in a manner that makes them more conspicuous; the most formal kimono display  on both sides of the chest, on the back of each sleeve, and in the middle of the back.

As in the past, modern  are not regulated by law, with the exception of the Imperial Chrysanthemum, which doubles as the national emblem, and the paulownia, which is the mon of the office of prime minister and also serves as the emblem of the cabinet and government (see national seals of Japan for further information). One of the best known examples of a  serving as a corporate logo is that of Mitsubishi, a name meaning 'three lozenges' (occasionally translated as 'three buffalo nuts'), which are represented as rhombuses. Another example of corporate use is the logo for the famous soy sauce maker Kikkoman, which uses the family  of the founder, and finally, the logo of music instrument/equipment and motorcycle builder Yamaha, which shows three tuning forks interlocked into the shape of a capital 'Y' in reference to both their name and the origin of the company.

In Western heraldry

Japanese  are sometimes used as charges or crests in Western heraldry. They are blazoned in traditional heraldic style rather than in the Japanese style. Examples include the swastika with arrows used by Japanese ambassador Hasekura Tsunenaga, the Canadian-granted arms of the Japanese-Canadian politician David Tsubouchi, and Akihito's arms as a Knight of the Garter.

Gallery of representative  by theme

Animal motif

Floral motif

Tool motif

Other motifs

See also
Coat of arms
Japanese rebus monogram
List of Japanese flags
National seals of Japan

References

External links

Japanese heraldry
Japanese coats of arms
Logos
Military communication in feudal Japan
Symbols
Visual motifs
Japanese words and phrases